Hardware keyloggers are used for keystroke logging, a method of capturing and recording computer users' keystrokes, including sensitive passwords. They can be implemented sala madarevel firmware, or 

alternatively, via a device plugged inline between a computer keyboard and a computer.  They log all keyboard activity to their internal memory.

Description
Hardware keyloggers have an advantage over software keyloggers as they can begin logging from the moment a computer is turned on (and are therefore able to intercept passwords for the BIOS or disk encryption software).

All hardware keylogger devices have to have the following:

 A microcontroller - this interprets the datastream between the keyboard and computer, processes it, and passes it to the non-volatile memory
 A non-volatile memory device, such as flash memory - this stores the recorded data, retaining it even when power is lost

Generally, recorded data is retrieved by typing a special password into a computer text editor. The hardware keylogger plugged in between the keyboard and computer detects that the password has been typed and then presents the computer with "typed" data to produce a menu. Beyond text menu some keyloggers offer a high-speed download to speed up retrieval of stored data; this can be via USB mass-storage enumeration or with a USB or serial download adapter.

Typically the memory capacity of a hardware keylogger may range from a few kilobytes to several gigabytes, with each keystroke recorded typically consuming a byte of memory.

Types of hardware keyloggers 

A regular hardware keylogger is used for keystroke logging by means of a hardware circuit that is attached somewhere in between the computer keyboard and the computer. It logs all keyboard activity to its internal memory which can be accessed by typing in a series of pre-defined characters. A hardware keylogger has an advantage over a software solution; because it is not dependent on the computer's operating system it will not interfere with any program running on the target machine and hence cannot be detected by any software.  They are typically designed to have an innocuous appearance that blends in with the rest of the cabling or hardware, such as appearing to be an EMC Balun.  They can also be installed inside a keyboard itself (as a circuit attachment or modification), or the keyboard could be manufactured with this "feature".  They are designed to work with legacy PS/2 keyboards, or more recently, with USB keyboards.  Some variants, known as wireless hardware keyloggers, have the ability to be controlled and monitored remotely by means of a wireless communication standard.
Wireless keylogger sniffers -  Collect packets of data being transferred from a wireless keyboard and its receiver and then attempt to crack the encryption key being used to secure wireless communications between the two devices.
Firmware - A computer's BIOS, which is typically responsible for handling keyboard events, can be reprogrammed so that it records keystrokes as it processes them.
Keyboard overlays - a fake keypad is placed over the real one so that any keys pressed are registered by both the eavesdropping device as well as the legitimate one that the customer is using.
Key commands - exist in much legitimate software. These programs require keyloggers to know when you’re using a specific command.

Countermeasures
Denial or monitoring of physical access to sensitive computers, e.g. by closed-circuit video surveillance and access control, is the most effective means of preventing hardware keylogger installation. Visual inspection is the easiest way of detecting hardware keyloggers. But there are also some techniques that can be used for most hardware keyloggers on the market, to detect them via software. In cases in which the computer case is hidden from view (e.g. at some public access kiosks where the case is in a locked box and only a monitor, keyboard, and mouse are exposed to view) and the user has no possibility to run software checks, a user might thwart a keylogger by typing part of a password, using the mouse to move to a text editor or other window, typing some garbage text, mousing back to the password window, typing the next part of the password, etc. so that the keylogger will record an unintelligible mix of garbage and password text. General keystroke logging countermeasures are also options against hardware keyloggers.

The main risk associated with keylogger use is that physical access is needed twice: initially to install the keylogger, and secondly to retrieve it. Thus, if the victim discovers the keylogger, they can then set up a sting operation to catch the person in the act of retrieving it. This could include camera surveillance or the review of access card swipe records to determine who gained physical access to the area during the time period that the keylogger was removed.

References

External links
 Presentation about detection of hardware keyloggers

Cryptographic attacks
Surveillance